"We Are the World" is a charity single originally recorded by the supergroup USA for Africa in 1985. It was written by Michael Jackson and Lionel Richie and produced by Quincy Jones and Michael Omartian for the album We Are the World. With sales in excess of 20 million copies, it is the eighth-bestselling physical single of all time.

Soon after the UK-based group Band Aid released "Do They Know It's Christmas?" in December 1984, the musician and activist Harry Belafonte began to think about an American benefit single for African famine relief. He enlisted fundraiser Ken Kragen to help bring the vision to reality. The duo contacted several musicians, and enlisted Jackson and Richie to write the song; they completed the writing seven weeks after the release of "Do They Know It's Christmas?", and only one night before "We Are the World"'s first recording session, on January 21, 1985. The historic event brought together some of the era's best-known musicians.

The song was released on March 7, 1985, as the first single from the album by Columbia Records. A worldwide commercial success, it topped music charts throughout the world and became the fastest-selling U.S. pop single in history. "We Are the World" received a Quadruple Platinum certification by the Recording Industry Association of America, becoming the first single to be certified multi-platinum.

Awarded numerous honors—including four Grammy Awards, one American Music Award, and a People's Choice Award—the song was promoted with a music video, a VHS, a special edition magazine, a simulcast, and several books, posters, and shirts. The promotion and merchandise helped "We Are the World" raise more than $63 million ($ million today) for humanitarian aid in Africa and the United States.

In January 2010, a magnitude 7.0 M earthquake devastated Haiti, leading another all-star cast of singers to remake the song. Titled "We Are the World 25 for Haiti", it was released as a single on February 12, 2010; proceeds from the record aided survivors in the impoverished country.

In March 2020, Richie suggested that a third version should be made to communicate a message of global solidarity during the COVID-19 pandemic and raise funds for aid efforts.

Background and writing

Inspired by Band Aid's "Do They Know It's Christmas?" project in the UK American entertainer and social activist Harry Belafonte had the idea to organize the recording of a song including all the generation's best-known music artists. He planned to have the proceeds donated to a new organization called United Support of Artists for Africa (USA for Africa). The non-profit foundation would then provide food and relief aid to starving people in Africa, specifically Ethiopia, where a 1983–1985 famine raged. The famine ultimately killed about one million people. Belafonte also planned to set aside money to help eliminate hunger in the United States of America. He contacted entertainment manager and fellow fundraiser Ken Kragen, who asked his clients Lionel Richie and Kenny Rogers to participate. Kragen and the two musicians agreed to help Belafonte, and in turn, enlisted the cooperation of Stevie Wonder, to add more "name value" to their project. Quincy Jones was drafted to co-produce the song, taking time out from his work on the film The Color Purple. Jones also telephoned Michael Jackson, who had released Thriller in 1982, and just concluded a tour with his brothers.

Jackson told Richie that he not only wanted to sing the song, but to help write it as well. The songwriting team originally included Wonder, but his time was constrained by his song-writing for the film The Woman in Red. So Jackson and Richie wrote "We Are the World" themselves at Hayvenhurst, the Jackson family home in Encino, California. They sought to write a song that would be easy to sing and memorable, yet still an anthem. For a week, the two spent every night working on lyrics and melodies in Jackson's bedroom. Jackson's older sister La Toya recounted the process in an interview with the U.S. celebrity news magazine People: "I'd go into the room while they were writing and it would be very quiet, which is odd, since Michael's usually very cheery when he works. It was very emotional for them." She also later said that Jackson wrote most of the lyrics "but he's never felt it necessary to say that".

Richie had recorded two melodies for "We Are the World", which Jackson took, adding music and words to the song on the same day. Jackson said, "I love working quickly. I went ahead without even Lionel knowing. I couldn't wait. I went in and came out the same night with the song completed: drums, piano, strings, and words to the chorus." Jackson then presented his demo to Richie and Jones, who were both shocked; they did not expect the pop star to see the structure of the song so quickly. The next meetings between Jackson and Richie were unfruitful; the pair produced no additional vocals and got no work done. It was not until the night of January 21, 1985, that Richie and Jackson completed the lyrics and melody of "We Are the World" within two and a half hours, one night before the song's first recording session.

Recording sessions

The first night of recording, January 22, 1985, had tight security on hand, as Richie, Jackson, Wonder, and Jones started work on "We Are the World" at Kenny Rogers' Lion Share Recording Studio. The studio, on Beverly Boulevard in Los Angeles, was filled with session musicians, technicians, video crews, retinue, assistants, and organizers as the celebrity musicians entered. Jones hired session musicians to lay down the backing tracks: John "JR" Robinson on drums, Louis Johnson on bass, and pianist Greg Phillinganes. (These three first played together on "Don't Stop 'Til You Get Enough" produced by Jones for Jackson.) Richie sat down at the piano to teach everyone the song. When it was time to roll tape, Robinson cleared the room of non-musicians, and the backing tracks were recorded. After this, a vocal guide of "We Are the World" was recorded by Richie and Jackson, mixed with the instrumental tracks, and duplicated on tape for each of the invited performers. The guide was recorded on the sixth take, as Jones felt that there was too much "thought" in the previous versions.

Following their work on the vocal guide, Jackson and Jones began thinking of alternatives for the line "There's a chance we're taking, we're taking our own lives": the pair was concerned that the latter part of the line would be considered a reference to suicide. As the group listened to a playback of the chorus, Richie declared that the last part of the line should be changed to "We're 'saving' our own lives". Jones also suggested altering the former part of the line. "One thing we don't want to do, especially with this group, is look like we're patting ourselves on the back. So it's really: 'There's a choice we're making.'" Around 1:30 am, the four musicians ended the night by finishing a chorus of melodic vocalizations, including the sound "sha-lum sha-lin-gay". Jones told the group that they were not to add anything else to the tape. "If we get too good, someone's gonna start playing it on the radio", he announced.

On January 24, 1985, after a day of rest, Jones shipped Richie and Jackson's vocal guide to all of the artists who would be involved in "We Are the World"s recording. Enclosed in the package was a letter from Jones, addressed to "My Fellow Artists":

Ken Kragen chaired a production meeting at a bungalow off Sunset Boulevard on January 25, 1985. There, Kragen and his team discussed where the recording sessions with the supergroup of musicians should take place. He said, "The single most damaging piece of information is where we're doing this. If that shows up anywhere, we've got a chaotic situation that could totally destroy the project. The moment a Prince, a Michael Jackson, a Bob Dylan—I guarantee you!—drives up and sees a mob around that studio, he will never come in." On the same night, Quincy Jones' associate producer and vocal arranger, Tom Bahler, was given the task of matching each solo line with the right voice. Bahler said, "It's like vocal arranging in a perfect world." Jones disagreed, saying that the task was like "putting a watermelon in a Coke bottle". The following evening, Lionel Richie held a "choreography" session at his home, where it was decided who would stand where.

The final night of recording was held on January 28, 1985, at A&M Recording Studios in Hollywood. Michael Jackson arrived at 8 p.m., earlier than the other artists, to record his solo section and record a vocal chorus by himself. He was subsequently joined in the recording studio by the remaining USA for Africa artists, who included Ray Charles, Billy Joel, Diana Ross, Cyndi Lauper, Bruce Springsteen, and Tina Turner. Also in attendance were five of Jackson's siblings: Jackie, La Toya, Marlon, Randy, and Tito. Many of the participants came straight from an American Music Awards ceremony that had been held that same night. Prince, who would have had a part in which he and Michael Jackson sang to each other, did not attend the recording session. The reason given for his absence has varied. One newspaper claimed that Prince did not want to record with other acts. Another report, from the time of "We Are the World"'s recording, suggested that the musician did not want to partake in the session because organizer Bob Geldof called him a "creep". Prince did, however, donate an exclusive track, "4 the Tears in Your Eyes", for the We Are the World album. Wonder asked Eddie Murphy to participate, but Murphy demurred, busy recording "Party All the Time". Murphy later said after he "realized what it was, [he] felt like an idiot." In all, more than 45 of America's top musicians participated in the recording, and another 50 had to be turned away. Upon entering the recording studio, the musicians were greeted by a sign pinned to the door that read, "Please check your egos at the door." They were also greeted by Stevie Wonder, who proclaimed that if the recording was not completed in one take, he and Ray Charles, two blind men, would drive everybody home.

Each of the performers took their position at around 10:30 p.m. and began to sing. Several hours passed before Stevie Wonder announced that he would like to substitute a line in Swahili for the "sha-lum sha-lin-gay" sound. At this point, Waylon Jennings left the recording studio for a short time when it was suggested by some that the song be sung in Swahili. A heated debate ensued, in which several artists also rejected the suggestion. The "sha-lum sha-lin-gay" sound ran into opposition as well and was subsequently removed from the song. Jennings returned to the studio and participated in the recording, which bears his name in the end credits. The participants eventually decided to sing something meaningful in English. They chose to sing the new line "One world, Our children", which most of the participants enjoyed.

In the early hours of the morning, two Ethiopian women, guests of Stevie Wonder, were brought into the recording studio. They thanked the singers on behalf of their country, bringing several artists to tears, before being led from the room. Wonder attempted to lighten the mood, by joking that the recording session gave him a chance to "see" fellow blind musician Ray Charles. "We just sort of bumped into each other!" The solo parts of the song were recorded without any problems. The final version of "We Are the World" was completed at 8 a.m.

Music and vocal arrangements

"We Are the World" is sung from a first-person viewpoint, allowing the audience to "internalize" the message by singing the word we together. It has been described as "an appeal to human compassion". The first lines in the song's repetitive chorus proclaim, "We are the world, we are the children, we are the ones who make a brighter day, so let's start giving". "We Are the World" opens with Lionel Richie, Stevie Wonder, Paul Simon, Kenny Rogers, James Ingram, Tina Turner, and Billy Joel singing the first verse. Michael Jackson and Diana Ross follow, completing the first chorus together. Dionne Warwick, Willie Nelson, and Al Jarreau sing the second verse, before Bruce Springsteen, Kenny Loggins, Steve Perry, and Daryl Hall go through the second chorus. Co-writer Jackson, Huey Lewis, Cyndi Lauper, and Kim Carnes follow with the song's bridge. This structuring of the song is said to "create a sense of continuous surprise and emotional buildup". "We Are the World" concludes with Bob Dylan and Ray Charles singing a full chorus, Wonder and Springsteen duetting, and ad libs from Charles and Ingram.

USA for Africa musicians

Release
On March 7, 1985, "We Are the World" was released as a single, in both 7-inch and 12-inch formats. The song was the only one released from the We Are the World album and became a chart success around the world. In the U.S., it was a number one hit on the R&B singles chart, the Hot Adult Contemporary Tracks chart, and the Billboard Hot 100, where it remained for a month. The single had debuted at number 21 on the Hot 100, the highest entry since Michael Jackson's "Thriller" entered the charts at number 20 the year before. It took four weeks for the song to claim the number one spot, half the time a single would normally have taken to reach its charting peak. On the Hot 100, the song moved from 21 to 5 to 2 and then number 1. "We Are the World" might have reached the top of the Hot 100 chart sooner, were it not for the success of Phil Collins' "One More Night", which received support from both pop and rock listeners. "We Are the World" also entered Billboards Top Rock Tracks and Hot Country Singles charts, where it peaked at numbers 27 and 76 respectively. The song became the first single since The Beatles' "Let It Be" to enter Billboards Top 5 within two weeks of release. Outside the U.S., the single reached number one in Australia, France, Ireland, New Zealand, The Netherlands, Norway, Sweden, Switzerland and the UK. The song peaked at number 2 in two countries: Germany and Austria.

The single was also a commercial success: the initial shipment of 800,000 "We Are the World" records sold out within three days of release. The record became the fastest-selling American pop single in history. At Tower Records in West Hollywood, 1,000 copies of the song were sold in two days. Store worker Richard Petitpas commented, "A number one single sells about 100 to 125 copies a week. This is absolutely unheard of." By the end of 1985, "We Are the World" had become the year's best-selling single. Five years later it was revealed that the song had become the biggest single of the 1980s. "We Are the World" was eventually cited as the best-selling single in U.S. and pop music history. The song became the first single to be certified multi-platinum; it received a 4× certification by the Recording Industry Association of America. The estimated global sales of "We Are the World" are said to be 20 million.

Reception
Despite the song's commercial success, "We Are the World" received mixed reviews from journalists, music critics, and the public at the time. American journalist Greil Marcus felt that the song sounded like a Pepsi jingle. He wrote that "the constant repetition of 'There's a choice we're making' conflates with Pepsi's trademarked 'The choice of a new generation' in a way that, on the part of Pepsi-contracted song writers Michael Jackson and Lionel Richie, is certainly not intentional, and even more certainly beyond the realm of serendipity." Marcus added, "In the realm of contextualization, 'We Are the World' says less about Ethiopia than it does about Pepsi—and the true result will likely be less that certain Ethiopian individuals will live, or anyway live a bit longer than they otherwise would have, than that Pepsi will get the catch phrase of its advertising campaign sung for free by Ray Charles, Stevie Wonder, Bruce Springsteen, and all the rest." Professor and activist Reebee Garofalo agreed, calling the line "We're saving our own lives" a "distasteful element of self-indulgence". He asserted that the artists of USA for Africa were proclaiming "their own salvation for singing about an issue they will never experience on behalf of a people most of them will never encounter".

In contrast, Stephen Holden of The New York Times praised the phrase "There's a choice we're making, We're saving our own lives". He wrote that the line assumed "an extra emotional dimension when sung by people with superstar mystiques". Holden wrote that the song was "an artistic triumph that transcends its official nature". He noted that unlike Band Aid's "Do They Know It's Christmas", the vocals on "We Are the World" were "artfully interwoven" and emphasized the individuality of each singer. Holden concluded that "We Are the World" was "a simple, eloquent ballad" and a "realized pop statement that would sound outstanding even if it weren't recorded by stars".

The song proved popular with both young and old listeners. People in Columbia, Missouri, reported they bought more than one copy of the single, some buying up to five copies of the record at one time.

According to music critic and Bruce Springsteen biographer Dave Marsh, "We Are the World" was not widely accepted within the rock music community. The author revealed that the song was "despised" for what it was not: "a rock record, a critique of the political policies that created the famine, a way of finding out how and why famines occur, an all-inclusive representation of the entire worldwide spectrum of post-Presley popular music". Marsh revealed that he felt some of the criticisms were right, while others were silly. He claimed that despite the sentimentality of the song, "We Are the World" was a large-scale pop event with serious political overtones.

"We Are the World" was recognized with several awards following its release. At the 1986 Grammy Awards, the song and its accompanying music video won four awards: Record of the Year, Song of the Year, Best Pop Performance by a Duo or Group with Vocal and Best Music Video, Short Form. The music video was awarded two honors at the 1985 MTV Video Music Awards. It collected the awards for Best Group Video and Viewer's Choice. People's Choice Awards recognized "We Are the World" with the Favorite New Song award in 1986. In the same year, the American Music Awards named "We Are the World" "Song of the Year", and honored organizer Harry Belafonte with the Award of Appreciation. Collecting his award, Belafonte thanked Ken Kragen, Quincy Jones, and "the two artists who, without their great gift would not have inspired us in quite the same way as we were inspired, Mr. Lionel Richie and Mr. Michael Jackson". Following the speech, the majority of USA for Africa reunited on stage, closing the ceremony with "We Are the World".

Track listing

Vinyl single
 "We Are the World" (USA for Africa) – 7:14
 "Grace" (Quincy Jones) – 4:56

Marketing and promotion
"We Are the World" was promoted with a music video, a video cassette, and several other items made available to the public, including books, posters, shirts and buttons. All proceeds from the sale of official USA for Africa merchandise went directly to the famine relief fund. All of the merchandise sold well; the video cassette—titled We Are the World: The Video Event—documented the making of the song, and became the ninth best-selling video of 1985. All of the video elements were produced by Howard G. Malley and Craig B. Golin along with April Lee Grebb as the production supervisor.
The music video showed the recording of "We Are the World", and drew criticism from some. Michael Jackson was reported to have joked before filming, "People will know it's me as soon as they see the socks. Try taking footage of Bruce Springsteen's socks and see if anyone knows who they belong to."

The song was also promoted with a special edition of the American magazine Life. The publication had been the only media outlet permitted inside A&M Recording Studios on the night of January 28, 1985. All other press organizations were barred from reporting the events leading up to and during "We Are the World"'s recording. Life ran a cover story of the recording session in its April 1985 edition of the monthly magazine. Seven members of USA for Africa were pictured on the cover: Bob Dylan, Bruce Springsteen, Cyndi Lauper, Lionel Richie, Michael Jackson, Tina Turner and Willie Nelson. Inside the magazine were photographs of the "We Are the World" participants working and taking breaks.

"We Are the World" received worldwide radio coverage in the form of an international simultaneous broadcast later that year. Upon spinning the song on their local stations, Georgia radio disc jockeys Bob Wolf and Don Briscar came up with the idea for a worldwide simulcast. They called hundreds of radio and satellite stations asking them to participate. On the morning of April 5, 1985 (Good Friday of that year) at 3:50 pm GMT, over 8,000 radio stations simultaneously broadcast the song around the world. As the song was broadcast, hundreds of people sang along on the steps of St. Patrick's Cathedral in New York. A year later, on March 28, 1986 (Good Friday of that year), the simultaneous radio broadcast of "We Are the World" was repeated over 6,000 radio stations worldwide.

"We Are the World" gained further promotion and coverage on May 25, 1986, when it was played during a major benefit event held throughout the US. Hands Across America—USA for Africa's follow-up project—was an event in which millions of people formed a human chain across the US. The event was held to draw attention to hunger and homelessness in the United States. "We Are the World"'s co-writer, Michael Jackson, had wanted his song to be the official theme for the event. The other board members of USA for Africa outvoted him, and it was instead decided that a new song would be created and released for the event, titled "Hands Across America". When released, the new song did not achieve the level of success that "We Are the World" did, and the decision to use it as the official theme for the event led to Jackson—who co-owned the publishing rights to "We Are the World"—resigning from the board of directors of USA for Africa.

Humanitarian aid
Four months after the release of "We Are the World", USA for Africa had taken in almost $10.8 million (equivalent to $ million today). The majority of the money came from record sales within the US. Members of the public also donated money—almost $1.3 million within the same time period. In May 1985, USA for Africa officials estimated that they had sold between $45 million and $47 million worth of official merchandise around the world. Organizer Ken Kragen announced that they would not be distributing all of the money at once. Instead, he revealed that the foundation would be looking into finding a long-term solution for Africa's problems. "We could go out and spend it all in one shot. Maybe we'd save some lives in the short term but it would be like putting a Band-Aid over a serious wound." Kragen noted that experts had predicted that it would take at least 10 to 20 years to make a slight difference to Africa's long-term problems.

In June 1985, the first USA for Africa cargo jet carrying food, medicine, and clothing departed for Ethiopia and Sudan. It stopped en route in New York, where 15,000 T-shirts were added to the cargo. Included in the supplies were high-protein biscuits, high-protein vitamins, medicine, tents, blankets and refrigeration equipment. Harry Belafonte, representing the USA for Africa musicians, visited Sudan in the same month. The trip was his last stop on a four-nation tour of Africa. Tanzanian Prime Minister Salim Ahmed Salim greeted and praised Belafonte, telling him, "I personally and the people of Tanzania are moved by this tremendous example of human solidarity."

One year after the release of "We Are the World", organizers noted that $44.5 million had been raised for USA for Africa's humanitarian fund. They stated that they were confident that they would reach an initial set target of $50 million (equivalent to $ million in ). By October 1986, it was revealed that their $50 million target had been met and exceeded; CBS Records gave USA for Africa a check for $2.5 million, drawing the total amount of money to $51.2 million. USA for Africa's Hands Across America event had also raised a significant amount of money—approximately $24.5 million for the hungry in the US.

Since its release, "We Are the World" has raised over $63 million (equivalent to $ million today) for humanitarian causes. Ninety percent of the money was pledged to African relief, both long and short term. The long-term initiative included efforts in birth control and food production. The remaining 10 percent of funds was earmarked for domestic hunger and homeless programs in the US. From the African fund, over 70 recovery and development projects were launched in seven African nations. Such projects included aid in agriculture, fishing, water management, manufacturing and reforestation. Training programs were also developed in the African countries of Mozambique, Senegal, Chad, Mauritania, Burkina Faso, and Mali.

Following Jackson's death in 2009, Elias Kifle Maraim Beyene, who grew up in Ethiopia and was a beneficiary of the aid provided by the single, related:

Notable live performances
"We Are the World" has been performed live by members of USA for Africa on several occasions both together and individually. One of the earliest such performances came in 1985, during the rock music concert Live Aid, which ended with more than 100 musicians singing the song on stage. Harry Belafonte and Lionel Richie made surprise appearances for the live rendition of the song. Michael Jackson would have joined the artists, but was "working around the clock in the studio on a project that he's made a major commitment to", according to his press agent, Norman Winter.

An inaugural celebration was held for US President-elect Bill Clinton in January 1993. The event was staged by Clinton's Hollywood friends at the Lincoln Memorial and drew hundreds of thousands of people. Aretha Franklin, LL Cool J, Michael Bolton and Tony Bennett were among some of the musicians in attendance. Said Jones, "I've never seen so many great performers come together with so much love and selflessness." The celebration included a performance of "We Are the World", which involved Clinton, his daughter Chelsea, and his wife Hillary singing the song along with USA for Africa's Kenny Rogers, Diana Ross and Michael Jackson. The New York Times Edward Rothstein commented on the event, stating, "The most enduring image may be of Mr. Clinton singing along in 'We Are the World', the first President to aspire, however futilely, to hipness."

As a prelude to his song "Heal the World", "We Are the World" was performed as an interlude during two of Michael Jackson's tours, the Dangerous World Tour (1992-1993) and the HIStory World Tour (1996-1997), as well as Jackson's performance at the Super Bowl XXVII halftime show in 1993. Jackson briefly performed the song with a chorus at the 2006 World Music Awards in London, which marked his last live public performance. Jackson planned to use the song for his This Is It comeback concerts at The O2 Arena in London from 2009 to 2010, but the shows were cancelled due to his sudden death.

Michael Jackson died in June 2009, after suffering a cardiac arrest. His memorial service was held several days later on July 7, and was reported to have been viewed by more than one billion people. The finale of the event featured group renditions of the Jackson anthems "We Are the World" and "Heal the World". The singalong of "We Are the World" was led by Darryl Phinnessee, who had worked with Jackson since the late 1980s. It also featured co-writer Lionel Richie and Jackson's family, including his children. Following the performance, "We Are the World" re-entered the US charts for the first time since its 1985 release. The song debuted at number 50 on Billboard Hot Digital Songs chart.

25 for Haiti

On January 12, 2010, a magnitude-7.0 earthquake struck Haiti, the island's most severe earthquake in over 200 years. The epicenter of the quake was just outside the Haitian capital Port-au-Prince. The Haitian government confirmed the deaths of over 230,000 civilians because of the disaster and the injuries of around 300,000. Approximately 1.2 million people were homeless and the lack of temporary shelter may have led to the outbreak of disease.

To raise money for earthquake victims, a new celebrity version of "We Are the World" was recorded on February 1, 2010, and released on February 12, 2010. Over 75 musicians were involved in the remake, which was recorded in the same studio as the 1985 original. The new version features revised lyrics as well as a rap part pertaining to Haiti. Michael Jackson's younger sister Janet duets with her late brother on the track, as per a request from their mother Katherine. In the video and on the track, archival material of Michael Jackson is used from the original 1985 recording. This version is also infamous for the way Wyclef sings towards the end of the song, fluctuating his voice in a manner that sounds like, as a music writer for the San Francisco Chronicle called it, "Not unlike a cross between a fire siren and the sound of Wyclef giving himself a hernia."

On February 20, 2010, a non-celebrity remake, "We Are the World 25 for Haiti (YouTube edition)", was posted to the video sharing website YouTube. Internet personality and singer-songwriter Lisa Lavie conceived and organized the Internet collaboration of 57 unsigned or independent YouTube musicians geographically distributed around the world. Lavie's 2010 YouTube version, a cover of the 1985 original, excludes the rap segment and minimizes the Auto-tune that characterizes the 2010 celebrity remake. Another 2010 remake of the original is the Spanish-language "Somos El Mundo". It was written by Emilio Estefan and his wife Gloria Estefan, and produced by Emilio, Quincy Jones and Univision Communications, the company that funded the project.

Legacy
"We Are the World" has been recognized as a politically important song, which "affected an international focus on Africa that was simply unprecedented". It has been credited with creating a climate in which musicians from around the world felt inclined to follow. According to The New York Times Stephen Holden, since the release of "We Are the World", it has been noted that movement has been made within popular music to create songs that address humanitarian concerns. "We Are the World" was also influential in subverting the way music and meaning were produced, showing that musically and racially diverse musicians could work together both productively and creatively. Ebony described the January 28 recording session, in which Quincy Jones brought together a multi-racial group, as being "a major moment in world music that showed we can change the world". "We Are the World", along with Live Aid and Farm Aid, demonstrated that rock music had become more than entertainment, but a political and social movement. Journalist Robert Palmer noted that such songs and events had the ability to reach people around the world, send them a message, and then get results.

Since the release of "We Are the World", and the Band Aid single that influenced it, numerous songs have been recorded in a similar fashion, with the intent to aid disaster victims throughout the world. One such example involved a supergroup of Latin musicians billed as "Hermanos del Tercer Mundo", or "Brothers of the Third World". Among the supergroup of 62 recording artists were Julio Iglesias, José Feliciano, and Sérgio Mendes. Their famine relief song was recorded in the same studio as "We Are the World". Half of the profits raised from the charity single was pledged to USA for Africa. The rest of the money was to be used for impoverished Latin American countries. Other notable examples include the 1989 cover of the Deep Purple song "Smoke on the Water" by a supergroup of hard rock, prog rock, and heavy metal musicians collaborating as Rock Aid Armenia to raise money for victims of the devastating 1988 Armenian earthquake and the 1986 all-star OPM single "Handog ng Pilipino sa Mundo", which talked about the optimism the Filipinos needed after the People Power Revolution.

The 20th anniversary of "We Are the World" was celebrated in 2005. Radio stations around the world paid homage to USA for Africa's creation by simultaneously broadcasting the charity song. In addition to the simulcast, the milestone was marked by the release of a two-disc DVD called We Are the World: The Story Behind the Song. Ken Kragen asserted that the reason behind the simulcast and DVD release was not for USA for Africa to praise themselves for doing a good job, but to "use it to do some more good [for the original charity]. That's all we care about accomplishing." Harry Belafonte also commented on the 20th anniversary of the song. He acknowledged that "We Are the World" had "stood the test of time"; anyone old enough to remember it can still at least hum along.

Parodies
"We Are the World" has been the subject of numerous parodies over the years. Notable examples include:
The Filipino comedy film I Have Three Hands, released in September 1985, featured a parody of the music video towards the end, where characters perform a song titled "Maid in the Philippines".
The British Satire television program Spitting Image aired a skit where puppet caricatures of celebrities sang the song "We're Scared of Bob", in which they claim to be participating out of fear of Bob Geldof. Some of the puppets portray members of USA for Africa, among other celebrities.
Johnson and Tofte released a parody called "We are the Worms" which speaks of worms making the choice to leave their underground homes when rain saturates the ground, only to be squished on the sidewalk when they emerge. 
A 1988 issue of MAD Magazine had a piece called "Bad News" about corruption in the world. One fake story was about 60,000 tons of acid sludge shipped to Africa, and a song "We are the Worst" to note this act of shame.
In 1992, sketch show In Living Color ran a skit called "Career Aid", parodying the fact that many artists to feature on "We Are the World" seemed to do so at a point where their own careers were struggling. Actor Jamie Foxx featured as Lionel Richie.
Also in 1992, the Married... with Children episode "Rock of Ages" featured the Bundy family performing "We Are the Old" in a music video with Spencer Davis, Richie Havens, Robby Krieger, Mark Lindsay, Peter Noone, and John Sebastian.
The thirteenth episode of The Simpsons third season, "Radio Bart", sees the residents of Springfield team up with musician Sting to produce a charity single "We're Sending Our Love Down the Well", based on "We Are The World", to offer support to a boy they believe is trapped down a well.
The sketch "Famous Helping People" on an early episode of Late Night with Conan O'Brien has Sting as the only performer to show up for a session arranged by Conan O'Brien, Andy Richter, and Max Weinberg, but the group can not decide which charity to record the song for.
In the season finale of the third season of the American television comedy series 30 Rock, "Kidney Now!", musicians including Clay Aiken, Elvis Costello, Mary J. Blige, Sheryl Crow, the Beastie Boys (Mike D and Ad Rock), Steve Earle, Adam Levine, Sara Bareilles, Wyclef Jean, Norah Jones, Talib Kweli, Michael McDonald, Rhett Miller, Moby, Robert Randolph, Rachael Yamagata and Cyndi Lauper produced a charity single to help Jack Donaghy's long-lost father get a new kidney.
A 1991 episode of Saturday Night Live featured the song 'Musicians For Free-Range Chickens', purporting to be an event organized by Lenny Kravitz and Whoopi Goldberg railing against the use of battery hens. The SNL cast impersonate many popular musicians of the day, and the episode's musical guest, Michael Bolton, plays himself.
A 2010 Saturday Night Live sketch parodied the negative critical response to "We Are the World 25 for Haiti", with impersonators pretending to come together to record the single "We Are the World 3: Raising Awareness of the 'We Are the World 2' Disaster."
During the 5th anniversary episode of Banana Split aired on ABS-CBN on November 23, 2013, the cast sang a special version of the song entitled "5 and Still Alive" with the lyrics discussing the past cast members, sketches and segments of the show during its early years.
The final episode of American late-night comedy talk show Chelsea Lately concluded with celebrities including Dave Grohl, Sammy Hagar, Gwen Stefani and Fergie singing a parody version of the song, with the lyrics altered to be a farewell to host comedian Chelsea Handler.
Controversial anti-LGBT church Westboro Baptist Church (WBC), known for their musical parodies, produced a parody of "We Are the World" titled "God Hates the World". In 2007, Warner Chappell Music unsuccessfully tried to prevent WBC from circulating the video on grounds of copyright infringement.
The South Park episode, "Put It Down", features the titular song played at the end of the episode where it appears to be a parody of "We Are the World".

Charts

Weekly charts

Year-end charts

Certifications and sales

See also

 Band Aid (band)
 Tears Are Not Enough
 Hear 'n Aid
 Cantaré, cantarás
 We Are One (global collaboration song)
 Chiquitita
 Music for UNICEF Concert
 We Con the World

Notes

References

Bibliography

 
 Breskin, David (2004). We Are the World: The Story Behind the Song booklet. Image Entertainment, Inc.
 
 
 
 George, Nelson (2004). Michael Jackson: The Ultimate Collection booklet. Sony BMG.

External links
 Official website of USA for Africa
 
 Official website for "We Are the World 25 for Haiti"
 
 Listen to USA for Africa's "We Are the World" on Last.fm

1985 songs
1980s ballads
1985 debut singles
Aid songs for Africa
All-star recordings
Billboard Hot 100 number-one singles
Cashbox number-one singles
CBS Records singles
Charity singles
Columbia Records singles
Dutch Top 40 number-one singles
European Hot 100 Singles number-one singles
Gospel songs
Grammy Award for Best Short Form Music Video
Grammy Award for Record of the Year
Grammy Award for Song of the Year
Irish Singles Chart number-one singles
Michael Jackson songs
Number-one singles in Australia
Number-one singles in Belgium
Number-one singles in Brazil
Number-one singles in Denmark
Number-one singles in Italy
Number-one singles in New Zealand
Number-one singles in Norway
Number-one singles in South Africa
Number-one singles in Sweden
Number-one singles in Switzerland
Pop ballads
RPM Top Singles number-one singles
SNEP Top Singles number-one singles
Song recordings produced by Michael Omartian
Song recordings produced by Quincy Jones
Songs about poverty
Songs against racism and xenophobia
Songs written by Lionel Richie
Songs written by Michael Jackson
UK Singles Chart number-one singles
USA for Africa songs
Vocal collaborations